Laureana Cilento is a town and comune in the province of Salerno in the Campania region of south-western Italy.

Geography 
Laureana borders with the municipalities of Agropoli, Castellabate, Lustra, Perdifumo and Torchiara. Its frazioni are the villages of Archi, Casaliello, Matonti, San Martino, San Cono, Spinelli and Vetrali.

References

External links

Cities and towns in Campania
Localities of Cilento